The 2023 USF Juniors championship will be the second season of USF Juniors. The season will feature a six-round 16-race calendar, 
which will begin on March 23 at Sebring International Raceway and conclude on August 27 at the Circuit of the Americas.

When the top rung of the Road to Indy ladder system, Indy Lights, was bought by Penske Entertainment (owners of INDYCAR) in 2021 and the lower level series changed sanctioning to the United States Auto Club, changes were made to the other championships in the ladder. This, together with the Indy Lights being rebranded to Indy NXT, effectively ended the "Road to Indy" branding, with the three championships below Indy NXT now collectively called "USF Pro Championships Presented by Cooper Tires". The USF Juniors serves as the bottom rung of this ladder.

Drivers and teams

Schedule

See also 

 2023 IndyCar Series
 2023 Indy NXT
 2023 USF Pro 2000 Championship
 2023 USF2000 Championship

References

External links 

 

USF Juniors
USF Juniors
USF Juniors
USF Juniors